Carly Margulies (born December 24, 1997) is an American freestyle skier who competed in the 2022 Winter Olympics in the women's halfpipe.

Personal life 
Margulies has been skiing since the age of eleven. Between 2015 and 2018, she has had seven knee surgeries. She currently resides in Park City, Utah.

References

External links
 

1997 births
Living people
American female freestyle skiers
Freestyle skiers at the 2022 Winter Olympics
Olympic freestyle skiers of the United States
21st-century American women
People from Mammoth Lakes, California